The Malaysia Agreement or the Agreement relating to Malaysia between United Kingdom of Great Britain and Northern Ireland, Federation of Malaya, North Borneo, Sarawak and Singapore (MA63) was the agreement which combined North Borneo, Sarawak, and Singapore with the existing states of the Federation of Malaya, the resulting union being named Malaysia. Singapore was later expelled from Malaysia, becoming an independent state on 9 August 1965.

Background 
The Malayan Union was established by the British Malaya and comprised the Federated Malay States of Perak, Selangor, Negeri Sembilan, Pahang; the Unfederated Malay States of Kedah, Perlis, Kelantan, Terengganu, Johor; and the Straits Settlements of Penang and Malacca.  It came into being in 1946, through a series of agreements between the United Kingdom and the Malayan Union. The Malayan Union was superseded by the Federation of Malaya on 1 February 1948, and achieved independence within the Commonwealth of Nations on 31 August 1957.

After the end of the Second World War, decolonisation became the societal goal of the peoples under colonial regimes aspiring to achieve self-determination.  The Special Committee on Decolonisation (also known as the U.N. Special Committee of the 24 on Decolonisation, reflected in the United Nations General Assembly's proclamation on 14 December 1960 of the Declaration on the Granting of Independence to Colonial Countries and Peoples hereinafter, the Committee of 24, or simply, the Decolonisation Committee) was established in 1961 by the General Assembly of the United Nations with the purpose of monitoring implementation of the Declaration on the Granting of Independence to Colonial Countries and Peoples and to make recommendations on its application. The committee is also a successor to the former Committee on Information from Non-Self-Governing Territories. Hoping to speed the progress of decolonisation, the General Assembly had adopted in 1960 the Resolution 1514, also known as the "Declaration on the Granting of Independence to Colonial Countries and Peoples" or simply "Declaration on Decolonisation". It stated that all people have a right to self-determination and proclaimed that colonialism should be brought to a speedy and unconditional end.

Under the Malaysia Agreement signed between Great Britain and the Federation of Malaya, Britain would enact an act to relinquish sovereign control over Singapore, Sarawak and North Borneo (now Sabah). This was accomplished through the enactment of the Malaysia Act 1963, clause 1(1) of which states that on Malaysia Day, "Her Majesty’s sovereignty and jurisdiction in respect of the new states shall be relinquished so as to vest in the manner agreed".

Decolonisation, self-determination and referendum 

The issue of self-determination with respect to the peoples of North Borneo, Sarawak, and Singapore formed the bedrock of yet another challenge to the formation of the Federation of Malaysia. Under the Joint Statement issued by the British and Malayan Federal Governments on 23 November 1961, clause 4 provided: Before coming to any final decision it is necessary to ascertain the views of the peoples. It has accordingly been decided to set up a Commission to carry out this task and to make recommendations ........

In the spirit of ensuring that decolonisation was carried in accordance with the wishes of the peoples of North Borneo, the
British Government, working with the Federation of Malaya Government, appointed a Commission of Enquiry for North Borneo and Sarawak in January 1962 to determine if the people supported the proposal to create a Federation of Malaysia. The five-man team, which comprised two Malayans and three British representatives, was headed by Lord Cobbold.

In Singapore, the People's Action Party (PAP) sought merger with Malaysia on the basis of the strong mandate it obtained during the general elections of 1959 when it won 43 of the 51 seats. However, this mandate became questionable when dissension within the Party led to a split. In July 1961, following a debate on a vote of confidence in the government, 13 PAP Assemblymen were expelled from the PAP for abstaining. They went on to form a new political party, the Barisan Sosialis, the PAP’s majority in the Legislative Assembly was whittled down as they now only commanded 30 of the 51 seats. More defections occurred until the PAP had a majority of just one seat in the Assembly. Given this situation, it would have been impossible to rely on the mandate achieved in 1959 to move forth with merger. A new mandate was necessary, especially since the Barisan argued that the terms of merger offered were detrimental to the Singapore people (such as having reduced seats in the federal parliament compared to its population, only being able to vote in Singapore elections, and the obligation that Singapore contribute 40% of its revenue to the federal government). In order to allay these concerns, a number of Singapore-specific provisions were included in the Agreement.

While Brunei sent a delegation to the signing of the Malaysia Agreement, they did not sign as the Sultan of Brunei wished to be recognised as the senior ruler in the federation.

On 11 September 1963, just four days before the new Federation of Malaysia was to come into being, the Government of the State of Kelantan sought a declaration that the Malaysia Agreement and Malaysia Act were null and void, or alternatively, that even if they were valid, they did not bind the State of Kelantan. The Kelantan Government argued that both the Malaysia Agreement and the Malaysia Act were not binding on Kelantan on the following grounds that the Malaysia Act in effect abolished the Federation of Malaya and this was contrary to the 1957 Federation of Malaya Agreement that the proposed changes required the consent of each of the constituent states of the Federation of Malaya – including Kelantan – and this had not been obtained. This suit was dismissed by James Thomson, then Chief Justice, who ruled that the constitution had not been violated during the discussion and creation of the Malaysia Act.

Documents 
The Malaysia Agreement lists annexes of

2019 review of the agreement 
After the proposed 2019 amendment to the Constitution of Malaysia on the equal status of Sabah and Sarawak failed to pass, the Malaysian federal government agreed to review the agreement to remedy breaches of the treaty with a "Special Cabinet Committee To Review the Malaysia Agreement". The seven agreed issues were:

 Export duty claims on logging exports and forest products.
 Gas distribution and regulatory powers on electricity and gas.
 Implementation of Federal and State Public Works.
 Manpower.
 The power of the state on health issues.
 Administration of Sipadan and Ligitan islands for Sabah.
 Agricultural and forestry issues.

The first meeting about these issues was held on 17 December 2018. Despite the willingness of the federal government to review the agreement, reports surfaced that negotiations between Sabah and the federal government had not been smooth, with the latter dictating some matters of the review, causing the perception that the review was a one-sided affair with the government appearing reluctant to relinquish control of affairs.

See also 

 18-point agreement
 20-point agreement
 2021 amendment to the Constitution of Malaysia
 Cobbold Commission
 Independence of Singapore Agreement 1965
 Indonesia–Malaysia confrontation
 Malaysia Act 1963
 Manila Accord
 Separatist movements in Malaysia
 Timeline of Malaysian history
 Proclamation of Singapore
 Vienna Convention on the Law of Treaties

References

External links 
 Hansard of Parliament of the United Kingdom Malaysia Bill
 Malaysia Act 1963
 Affecting the Malaysia Act 1963
 Solidarity with the Peoples of Non-Self-Governing Territories by Resolution of General Assembly 60/119 of 18 January 2006
 Trust and Non-Self-Governing Territories listed by the United Nations General Assembly.
 United Nations General Assembly 18th Session - the Question of Malaysia (pages:41-44) 
 Malaysia Timeline by the BBC News Channel.

Further reading 
 
 
 
James Chin (2019) The 1963 Malaysia Agreement (MA63): Sabah And Sarawak and the Politics of Historical Grievances - Via ResearchGate

1963 in Malaysia
Formation of Malaysia
Legal documents
Separatism in Malaysia
Treaties of Malaysia
Treaties of North Borneo
Treaties of the United Kingdom
Treaties of the Federation of Malaya
Treaties of Sarawak
Treaties of Singapore
Treaties concluded in 1963
1963 in London